Martha Oliver may refer to:
 Martha Capps Oliver, American poet and hymnwriter
 Martha Cranmer Oliver, English actress and theatre manager